Il ritorno del Monnezza is a 2005 Italian comedy film directed by Carlo Vanzina.

The film pays hommage to the 1970s poliziotteschi. The main character Rocky Giraldi, played by Claudio Amendola, is a combination of two of the most popular characters of the genre, Er Monnezza and Nico Giraldi, both originally played by actor Tomas Milian.

Cast

References

External links

Il ritorno del Monnezza at Variety Distribution

2005 films
Films directed by Carlo Vanzina
2000s Italian-language films
2005 comedy films
Italian comedy films
2000s Italian films